The Seoul–Yangyang Expressway is an expressway in South Korea, connecting the cities of Seoul and Yangyang County. It is 78.5 kilometers long, with two lanes of traffic in each direction and ten interchanges.  It shares the number "60" and operates by Seoul-Chuncheon Highway Corporation, as a privately financed toll road. The extension to the end at the eastcoast is to be opened June 30, 2017.

The estimated travel time between the two cities is roughly 40 minutes, saving about more than half of the previous travel time on the National Road No.46. Because the toll road was considered to be "privately funded", the toll for a passenger car is 5,900 won. After several complaints from the people and organizations of northwestern Gangwon, the toll for a user living in Chuncheon City and its surrounding region was reduced to 5,200 won.

Construction was completed on July 15, 2009, with an active passenger-passing and its official opening ceremony held on the same day, at a total cost of slightly over 2 trillion won. According to the South Korean Governmental decision made in December 2002, its original name is Seoul-Yangyang Expressway, however, it will be expanded completely on 2014, because, though the construction of a phase from Chuncheon Junction to East Hongcheon Interchange finished (earlier than expected) on October 30, 2009, by public-funded KEC, its last phase, East Hongcheon to Yangyang has been started in May 2009.

Gapyeong County Bus No. 8004, Gwangju Urban Bus No. 8002, and Namyangju Urban Bus No. 8012 use this highway.

It has the longest road tunnel in South Korea, .

List of facilities 

 IC: Interchange, JC: Junction, SA: Service Area, TG:Tollgate

See also
Roads and expressways in South Korea
Transport in South Korea
Gangwon
Chuncheon
Gyeongchun Line, Railroad (operated by Korail)

References

External links
Seoul-Chuncheon Expressway Corporation (Korean)
MOCT South Korean Government Transport Department

Chuncheon
Expressways in South Korea
Roads in Seoul
Roads in Gyeonggi
Roads in Gangwon